Matt James may refer to:

Matt James (rugby league) (born 1987), British rugby league player
Matt James (TV presenter), British host of shows such as The City Gardener
Matt James (game designer) (born 1981), American game designer
Matt James (television personality) (born 1991), American television personality

See also
Matthew James (disambiguation)